The  is a compact car manufactured by Toyota as a variant of the Toyota Corolla. Exclusively sold in the Japanese domestic market, the Sprinter was aimed to be sportier than its Corolla sibling, with the Sprinter being sold at the Toyota Auto Store (renamed to Toyota Vista Store in 1980 and Netz Store in 1998) while the Corolla was sold at the eponymous Toyota Corolla Store, which focused on economical cars compared to the more upmarket Vista store.

The Sprinter is notable for being used as the base vehicle for two joint projects between Toyota and General Motors in the United States and Australia, known under GM as the S-car. From 1984 to 2002, variants of the Sprinter were manufactured by NUMMI in Fremont, California, known as the Chevrolet Nova (1984–1988), Geo Prizm (1988–1997), and Chevrolet Prizm (1997–2002). The Holden Nova was manufactured by United Australian Automobile Industries from 1989 to 1996.

Each generation of the Corolla had a corresponding Sprinter sibling, until the introduction of the E120-series Corolla in 2000. The Sprinter was directly replaced by the Toyota Allex, while the Corolla-derived Pontiac Vibe was imported from the United States to the Japanese domestic market badged as the Toyota Voltz. Both were sold at the Netz Store, which succeeded the Toyota Auto Store/Toyota Vista Store dealer network.



First generation (E10; 1968) 

The first generation Sprinter was introduced in March 1968 as a fastback version of the first generation Corolla, and sold at Japanese dealership sales channel called Toyota Auto Store. This was the only version to include the word "Corolla" in its name. Like the rest of the Corolla range, the 1077 cc K engine was upgraded to the 1166 cc 3K engine in September 1969. The Corolla was sold at a different dealership in Japan called Toyota Corolla Store.

Second generation (E20; 1970) 

In May 1970, the Sprinter was released as a variation of the second generation Corolla coupé. Toyota had promised its Toyota Corolla Store dealers in Japan that they would receive exclusive rights to sell the Corolla. In order to sell through the Toyota Auto Store dealer network, the Sprinter was no longer called a Corolla, even though the differences were mostly cosmetic.

In Japan, the 3K engine was supplemented by a 1407 cc T engine in September 1970. Some markets received the 1588 cc 2T engine in March 1972. With the twincam 2T-G engine the vehicle was known as the Sprinter Trueno. A special model called the "Sprinter Trueno J" had all the Trueno's equipment but used the single-cam, twin carburetor 2T-B engine.

Third generation (E40, E60; 1974) 

1974 brought the third generation Sprinter based on the third generation Corolla coupe, 2 door sedan, 4 door sedan and liftback. Once again, the differences between the Corolla and Sprinter were mostly cosmetic. Sedans received a more formal upright grill, while the coupe and liftback received a sleeker, aerodynamic looking frontal treatment.

The Corolla's were given E30-38 codes while the Sprinter's were given corresponding E41-47 codes. When the Corolla range received a minor update in March 1977 to become the E50-55 series, the Sprinter received a corresponding update to become the E60 series. In 1978, the Sprinter saw a competitor introduced by Nissan called the Pulsar.

Fourth generation (E70; 1979) 

The 1979 fourth generation Sprinter was based on the fourth generation Corolla coupe, 2 door sedan, 4-door sedan and liftback. As before, the differences were cosmetic—the Corollas had a simpler treatment of the grill, head lights and tail lights while the Sprinter used a slightly more complex, sculpted treatment. In August 1981, along with the 1.5 and 1.6-liter engines being changed to the new A engines, the Sprinter received a facelift with a wedge-shaped nose.

Images of this generation can be found here

Fifth generation (E80; 1983) 

The fifth generation Sprinter was based on the 1983 fifth generation Corolla range. Like the Corolla, the model line was split into FWD and RWD models. This was the last generation of Sprinters to have RWD, so it remains a favourite of sports car enthusiasts—particularly in drifting. Fame was brought to this model by its appearance in the Initial D Japanese animation.

The four door sedan and the five door liftback were sold in North America under the resurrected name of Chevrolet Nova, the first of several Toyotas built by General Motors known as their S-platform under license at NUMMI.

The Japanese market Sprinter was available as the following models:

The AE82 Sprinter sedan had slightly different head lamps compared to the AE82 Corolla, windows in the inclined c-pillars, different tail lamps the boot was placed a little higher and front aero grills were like the AE86 Levin. It had an overall similarity with the AE86 Levin coupe. The RWD Sprinter came with pop-up head lamps (the Corolla had fixed head lamps) and the front bumper was raised a little to accommodate them. The US Corolla GTS shared the head lamps with the Japanese market AE86 Sprinter but with small differences such as lower lift height and US globe fittings. The Sprinter sold in Australia was actually identical to a Japanese market Corolla in all of its specifications (e.g. no pop-up head lamps, Japanese market tail lamps).

FWD grades:
 ZX, SX
 DX,Special DX
 XL, Super XL, XL Lisse
 SE, SE Saloon, Riviere
 SR, GT

RWD grades:
 XL, SE, SR, GT, GTV, GT Apex, Black Limited

Sixth generation (E90; 1987) 

The sixth generation Sprinter was shared with the sixth generation Corolla range, introduced in May 1987. They were offered as FWD & full-time 4WD. In this generation, the RWD configuration was discontinued, and all cars were FWD. The Sprinter was offered as a sedan, coupe, 5-door liftback called Sprinter Cielo, and station wagon named Sprinter Carib.

The sedan and liftback had the same front ends but different rear ends. The JDM market Sprinter Trueno coupe had retractable head lamps, and is now offered in FWD rather than RWD. It was the basis for the American Corolla coupe. In the United States, the Sprinter sedan and liftback with slightly different front end were sold as Geo Prizm.

Exterior

The E90 models started production in 1988 and ended in mid-1991; like previous models it got mid-life facelifts called (ZENKI) 1st face and (KOUKI) 2nd face. The GT versions, as usual, were given a front lip and a spoiler at the back.

The Sprinter was available as the following models:

The Sprinter was available in the following grades:
MX, MX saloon, SE, XL, GT, AV-I, AV-II, RVS, GT Apex (other)

Seventh generation (E100; 1991) 

The seventh generation Sprinter was shared with the seventh generation Corolla range introduced in June 1991. This platform continued to be produced in North America as the Geo Prizm sedan, as the liftback body style was discontinued in the North American market.

For this generation only, Toyota introduced a 4-door hardtop sedan (with frameless door windows) called the Sprinter Marino.

The new 20-valve 4A-GE ("Silver Top") engines were ahead of its time when they were offered during this generation, coming with features like VVT, individual throttle bodies (ITB's), a compression ratio of 10.8:1 and a five-valve-per-cylinder head design. This helped the cars equipped with it to accelerate from 0–100 km/h in approximately 6 seconds and reach a top speed of over 200 km/h.

A five-valve-per-cylinder engine was unusual for the time, however Mitsubishi was the first to offer a five-valve-per-cylinder engine in the Minica Dangan ZZ-4 kei car in 1989.

Eighth generation (E110; 1995) 

The eighth generation Sprinter was shared with the eighth generation Corolla range from May 1995. This is the last time Toyota used the Sprinter badge. After this, Toyota used the Allex badge. The E110 Sprinter was only marketed in the Japanese market. Its exterior was similar to the E110 Corolla but there were small differences like the Sprinter badges in the front grill, alternative rear lights, and the addition of a rear quarter window in the C-pillars. This body style continued in North America, with some minor changes, as the Chevrolet Prizm, when the Geo brand was discontinued.

In Japan, the Sprinter Carib was based on the 5-door 1.6 L (1,587 cc) station wagon. This version came standard with electric windows, air bags for both driver and front passenger and automatic transmission; several engine options were available. Externally it could be distinguished from the Corolla by its black, rather than body-coloured upper bumper and side moldings and door handles. In front, new headlights and air intake moldings and radiator intake openings were used, often with a "Carib" nameplate. The Carib was also fitted with a spoiler, with an integrated brake light, above the rear window on the back hatch, and some were fitted with roof rails. A "Carib" decal was used on the right, rear window in place of "Corolla". Some versions of the Carib were four-wheel drive. Hiroshi Okamoto designed the front exterior design.

Engines

2E-E, 5A-FE, 4A-FE, 4A-GE (16-valve), 4A-GE (20-valve), 2C

Ninth, tenth, and eleventh generations (E120, E140, E180; 2006, 2010, 2014) 
The Sprinter name was reused as a sportier specification of the ninth generation Corolla in South Africa in 2006. The next two generations of the Corolla Sprinter, based on the tenth and eleventh generations of the Corolla, were released in 2010 and 2014.

References

External links 

 AE82 Chevrolet Nova review

Sprinter
1960s cars
1970s cars
1980s cars
1990s cars
2000s cars
Toyota Corolla